Darktrace is a British-American information technology company that specialises in cyber-defence. The company was established in 2013 and is headquartered in Cambridge, England and San Francisco, California, United States. It is listed on the London Stock Exchange and is a constituent of the FTSE 250 Index.

History
Darktrace was founded in 2013 in Cambridge, in a collaboration with the British intelligence agencies and Invoke Capital, a company owned by Mike Lynch. Lynch was co-founder of Autonomy, sold to Hewlett-Packard in 2011 in a transaction leading to accusations of fraud and to a legal fight over extraditing him  to the United States. In its stock market listing registration documents Darktrace rated the potential liability relating to the fallout of the action against Lynch as "low risk".

Many of Darktrace's management personnel, including chief executive Poppy Gustafsson, chief technology officer Jack Stockdale, and chief strategy and artificial intelligence officer Nicole Eagan, were recruited from Autonomy. By the end of 2013, as well as being a wholly owned subsidiary of Invoke Capital, Invoke Capital additionally provided 15 of Darktrace's 40 staff members.

In 2017, Darktrace caused an internet and media sensation with publication of a white paper detailing a hack of a casino's fish tank, which was caught by the company's Network Immune System. 

In April 2021, Darktrace listed on the London Stock Exchange with a market value of circa £2.5 billion. The market value reached a peak of £7 billion within months, with a share value peak of £10, but later fluctuated. On 6 March 2022, Darktrace opened with a share value of £6.46, with a market cap of £3.43 billion.

There has been criticism about the company's technology and its founding investor by short-seller Matthew Earl, head of the Shadowfall fund, and analysts Peel Hunt. In January 2022, Earl questioned Darktrace's model and culture, warning clients that the company's model was "watery-thin", based more on sales style than business substance.  

In March 2022, Darktrace acquired Cybersprint, a Dutch attack surface management company, for €47.5million.

Report on accounting irregularities
On 31 January 2023, a New York-based hedge fund and short seller, published a detailed report alleged potential accounting errors at Darktrace, making claims about potential irregularities in contracts with resellers and customers, predominantly dating from before Darktrace’s public listing in 2021. Darktrace has disputed this. Quintessential pointed towards connections between Darktrace and HP Autonomy, the UK software company with which Darktrace shares many ties. Autonomy was accused of irregular accounting practices relating to its $11.7bn sale to Hewlett-Packard in 2011.

The company’s share price fell 12 per cent when Quintessential first disclosed its short position on 30 January 2023. The shares then fell a further 8 per cent the following day, after the report was published, down to 200p.

Products
Darktrace's product uses unsupervised (in particular) machine learning techniques to build an intrinsic "pattern of life" for every network, device, and user within an organisation. From this evolving understanding of 'normal', it can then detect potential threats as they emerge in real time. It employs an autonomous response technology, Antigena, to take action against in-progress cyber-attacks. The product also visualises network activity on a user interface, called the 'Threat Visualiser'. Since the company's inception in 2013, its technology has been deployed some 9,000 times. Currently, Darktrace can cover Industrial Operational Technology, Email, SaaS, Cloud, Network, and Endpoint.

Darktrace has claimed that it has the capability to defend against zero-day attacks, for example some log4j attacks.

Awards
Darktrace was included in Fast Company's 50 Most Innovative Companies for 2018, The Cyber Award's AI Product of the Year in 2020, Time Magazine's 100 Most Influential Companies in 2021 and Fast Company's top 10 most innovative AI companies for 2022. In 2022, Darktrace won the AI & Machine Learning Award at the 2022 Go:Tech Awards.

Sponsorship
Darktrace signed a partnership deal with McLaren Racing in 2020. In 2021, the deal was extended to include McLaren's IndyCar team.

References

Companies based in Cambridge
Companies based in San Francisco
Companies listed on the London Stock Exchange
British companies established in 2013
2013 establishments in England
2021 initial public offerings